Masaka is a town in Nasarawa, central Nigeria. It is a district of Karu Local Government Area, Nasarawa State and is among the towns that forms the Karu urban area, a conurbation of towns under Karu Local Government Area of Nasarawa State.
The neighbouring towns to Masaka, also in this urban area as a result of their merger following a population explosion in the zone, are:
Mararaba,
Ado,
New Nyanya,
  Masaka,
New Karu and Kurunduma
This urban area developed following the expansion of administrative and economic activities of Abuja, the capital of Nigeria, into the urban areas surrounding. The evacuation of tens of thousands of people from Abuja by the Federal Capital Territory (Nigeria) (F C T) administration also led to an increase in population of this urban area.

Transportation 
Masaka is served by a modern expressway, built to link Keffi to Abuja.

References 

Populated places in Nasarawa State
Populated places in the Federal Capital Territory (Nigeria)